Windlust is a smock mill in Noordwolde, Friesland, Netherlands which was built in 1860 and is in working order. The mill is listed as a Rijksmonument.

History
Windlust was built in 1860 by millwright Aberson of Steenwijk, Overijssel. On 1880, it was raised by millwright Middendorp of Wolvega, Friesland. In 1921, a brick engine house was added to the base. It houses a hot bulb engine by Schless und Rossmann of Cassel, Hesse, Germany. The engine was supplied by Fabrikaat Ten Zijthoff en Zoon, Deventer, Overijssel. Further restoration work was carried out in 1964, 1986 and 1990. The mill was owned by the Timmerman family. Windlust was worked mostly by engine in the 1930s, cur mostly by wind during World War II. Its condition deteriorated post-war and the mill ceased working in 1953. The mill was restored in 1959–62, its wooden windshaft being replaced by a cast-iron one, and the sails were fitted with the Fok system on the leading edges The work was carried out by millwright Medendorp of Zuidlaren, Drenthe.

Following the death of its owner in December 1968, Windlust was bequeathed to the Stichting De Oosthoek. The mill was not worked at all for three years, and then only occasionally until 1975. Since then, it is regularly worked on a Saturday. Repairs done to the hot bulb engine in 1983 allow it to be used to demonstrate milling by engine. The mill was damaged by a storm on 18 January 2007, but was soon repaired. It was returned to working order by June 2007. Windlust is listed as a Rijksmonument, number 38864.

Description

Windlust is what the Dutch describe as a "Stellingmolen". It is a smock mill on a brick base. The smock and cap are thatched. The mill is winded by tailpole and winch. The sails are Common sails with the Fok system on the leading edges. The sails are carried on a cast-iron windshaft which was made by Gietijzerij H. J. Koning of Foxham, Groningen. The windshaft also carries the brake wheel, which has 57 cogs. This drives the wallower (28 cogs) at  the top of the upright shaft. At the bottom of the upright shaft is the great spur wheel, which has 61 cogs. The great spur wheel drives one pair of millstones via a lantern pinion stone nut which has 21 staves. The Cullen millstones are  diameter. The hot bulb engine drives a pair of  diameter Cullen stones separate to the wind driven stones.

Millers
O Bel (1859- )
L Dijkstra ( -1885)
Harm van der Weerst (1885–91)
Geerhof Smit (1891–98)
Cornelis Greven (1898-1906)
Jan Timmerman (1906–27)
Sietze Timmerman (1927–68)

References for above:-

Public access

Windlust is open to the public on Saturdays between 13:00 and 17:30.

References

Windmills in Friesland
Windmills completed in 1860
Smock mills in the Netherlands
Grinding mills in the Netherlands
Agricultural buildings in the Netherlands
Rijksmonuments in Friesland
Octagonal buildings in the Netherlands